Bachelot is a surname. Notable people with the surname include:

Alexis Bachelot, SS.CC., P.A., (1796–1837), Roman Catholic priest and the Prefect Apostolic of the Sandwich Islands (present Hawaii)
François Bachelot (born 1940), French physician and politician.
Jean Bachelot La Pylaie (1786–1856), French botanist, explorer and archaeologist
Jean-François Bachelot (born 1977), retired professional tennis player from France
Roselyne Bachelot (born 1946), French politician

French-language surnames